Missing (originally titled 1-800-Missing) is a Canadian crime drama television series based on the 1-800-WHERE-R-YOU book series by Meg Cabot. The series aired on the A network and W Network in Canada, and on Lifetime in the United States from August 2003 to February 2006.

Synopsis
The series is centred on Jess Mastriani, played by Caterina Scorsone, a woman in her twenties who receives psychic abilities after being hit by lightning. She is employed by a special FBI Task Force because she has visions which, once interpreted, contain clues that will help her find missing people. The series initially starred Gloria Reuben as Brooke Haslett, Jess's skeptical partner. Other stars of the series during its first season included Justina Machado as Sunny Estrada, and Dean McDermott as Alan Coyle. Alberta Watson appeared in the pilot as Jess' mother, however; the part was later recast and Watson did not appear on the show again.

In the second season, significant changes, including casting, were made. The show was completely retooled. Jess's partner was changed to Nicole Scott, portrayed by Vivica A. Fox. Taking Sunny's place was Mark Consuelos, and Justin Louis assumed the role of the Assistant Director John Pollock. Jess's psychic powers remained important, but more focus was given to the other characters.

The series finale aired on February 5, 2006 alongside the show's partner Strong Medicine and, in April 2006, it was revealed that Missing had been cancelled after a successful three-year, fifty-six-episode run. Lifetime said the show had "run its course."

Cast
 Gloria Reuben as FBI Agent Brooke Haslett (season 1)
 Caterina Scorsone as FBI Agent Jess Mastriani
 Dean McDermott as FBI Special Agent in Charge Alan Coyle (season 1)
 Adam MacDonald as Douglas (main: season 1; guest: season 2)
 Alberta Watson/Maria Ricossa as Toni Mastriani (guest: seasons 1–2)
 Justina Machado as FBI Agent Sunny Estrada (season 1) 
 Vivica A. Fox as FBI Agent Nicole Scott (seasons 2–3)
 Mark Consuelos as FBI Agent Antonio Cortez (seasons 2–3)
 Justin Louis as Assistant Director John Pollock (seasons 2–3)

Episodes

Season 1 (2003–04)

Season 2 (2004–05)

Season 3 (2005–06)

Home media
The only DVD release to date has been the show's second season (titled as Missing: Season 2) as a four disc set from Lions Gate Home Entertainment on January 24, 2006.

Footnotes

References

External links
 Missing at Mylifetime.com
 
 
 Missing scripts by Lee Goldberg & William Rabkin

2003 Canadian television series debuts
2006 Canadian television series endings
2000s Canadian crime drama television series
A-Channel original programming
CTV 2 original programming
Lifetime (TV network) original programming
Television series about the Federal Bureau of Investigation
Missing Canadian
Television series by Bell Media
Television series by Lionsgate Television
Television series by Sony Pictures Television
Television shows about precognition
Television shows based on American novels
Television shows filmed in Toronto